The Wernerian Natural History Society (12 January 1808 – 16 April 1858), commonly abbreviated as the Wernerian Society, was a learned society interested in the broad field of natural history, and saw papers presented on various topics such as mineralogy, plants, insects, and scholarly expeditions. The Society was an offshoot of the Royal Society of Edinburgh, and from its beginnings it was a rather elite organization.

The Society was named after Abraham Gottlob Werner, a German geologist who was a creator of Neptunism, a theory of superposition based on a receding primordial ocean that had deposited all the rocks in the crust. At this time all rocks, including basalt, and crystalline substances were thought by some to be precipitated from solution.

History

Robert Jameson, Regius Professor of Natural History at the University of Edinburgh, was the founder and life president of the Society.  In 1800, he spent a year at the mining academy in Freiberg, Saxony, where he studied under Werner. The Society was founded on 12 January 1808, and the first meeting of the Society occurred on 2 March 1808. Between 1811 and 1839 eight volumes of  Memoirs of the Wernerian Natural History Society appeared. More than twelve of Jameson's papers on geology and mineralogy were published in these volumes, and he also contributed some on zoology and botany. Proceedings after 1839 were published in Jameson's Edinburgh New Philosophical Journal. The Society hosted many of the notable scientists of its day.

Decline
There were no meetings from 1850–1856, which coincided with the decline of Jameson himself. It was eventually decided to close the Society down and dispose of its assets, and it finally closed on 16 April 1858.

Letters
Members of the Wernerian Society were entitled to use the abbreviation M.W.S. after their name.  "Corresponding members", based outside Edinburgh, used the designation C.M.W.S.

Notable members

Founding members
Founding members, as of 12 January 1808:
 
Honorary
Abraham Gottlob Werner
Sir Joseph Banks, President, Royal Society
Richard Kirwan, President, Royal Irish Academy

Resident
Robert Jameson, F.R.S.Edin., Professor of Natural History, University of Edinburgh
William Wright, M.D., F.R.S.S. (London and Edinburgh), A.L.S.
Thomas Macknight, D.D., F.R.S.Edin.
John Barclay, M.D., F.R.S.Edin., Lecturer in Anatomy
Thomas Thomson, M.D., F.R.S.Edin.
Col. Stewart Murray Fullerton (a.k.a. Fullarton)
Charles Anderson, M.D., F.R.C.S.Edin., Surgeon, of Leith
Patrick Walker, Esq., F.L.S.
Patrick Neill, A.M., A.L.S. (Secretary 1808-1849)

Other members
John Hutton Balfour, Regius Keeper of the Royal Botanic Garden Edinburgh
Sir Charles Bell, surgeon, anatomist, neurologist and philosophical theologian; authority on the human nervous system
William Borrer, botanist
Robert Brown, botanist and palaeobotanist, the first observer of Brownian motion
William Bullock an English traveller, naturalist and antiquarian.
Edward Donovan Anglo Irish writer, natural history illustrator and zoologist.
James Duncan (Zoologist), Entomologist.
John Goodsir, anatomist, pioneer of cell biology
Robert Graham, botanist
Robert Knox, surgeon, anatomist and zoologist, whose career was ruined by his involvement in the Burke and Hare case
King Leopold I of Belgium
William Lochead, surgeon and superintendent of the Saint Vincent Botanical Garden
William MacGillivray, naturalist and ornithologist who worked with Audubon
Sir James McGrigor, physician, military surgeon and botanist who founded the Royal Army Medical Corps
Joseph Mitchell, civil engineer
Samuel Mitchill, physician, naturalist and member of the U.S. House of Representatives and Senate
Friedrich Mohs, geologist and mineralogist who devised Mohs scale of physical hardness
Alexander Monro, tertius, surgeon and anatomist who taught Darwin
Sir William Parry, Arctic explorer
Marc-Auguste Pictet, physicist and meteorologist
James Cowles Prichard, ethnologist and physician
William Scoresby, whaler, Arctic explorer, and clergyman
Robert Stevenson, lighthouse engineer
Thomas Stewart Traill, physician, natural historian and scholar of medical jurisprudence
James Watt, pioneer of the industrial revolution
William Hyde Wollaston, physicist, chemist and physiologist who discovered Rhodium and Palladium

References

1808 establishments in Scotland
Organizations established in 1808
Royal Society of Edinburgh
Learned societies of Scotland
1858 disestablishments in Scotland
19th century in Scotland
19th century in science
Organisations based in Edinburgh
History of Edinburgh
Natural history societies